Suşehri is a town and a district of Sivas Province of Turkey. The mayor is Fazlı Yüksel (AKP).

Suşehri is one of the country sides of Sivas.

Name
The first localization of Suşehri is 2 km east of the city centre. After the country, called Bulahiye, had collapsed by earthquakes started to grow with the name of Andıryas at the place where it is now. In Kurdish the known as Bilekan.

According to county arrangement, which is done in 1857, Şebinkarahisar was gotten from Trabzon, then Amasya, Tokat and Şebinkarahisar were given to Sivas. with this arrangement Gölova (Suşar) and Akşar were cancelled. Then Village of Endıres was composed a county and called Suşehri.

In 1933 Şebinkarahisar became a town with a new law and it was given Giresun and Suşehri was given Sivas. However Suşehri is a part of Caucasian with its properties of culture and geography.

Administration
City of Suşehri depended to Sivas with its administrative. There are two city organization which are city center and Çataloluk Village. Also there are 70 villages, 42 fields and 112 digs. It is as far as 132 km from Sivas.

History

Suşehri is an ancient localization centre. According to accounts its history begins from Bronze Age. In the nearby plain objects were found which prove that the area was inhabited during the Bronze Age. This area called Kayadelen Village which is under the barrage of Kılıçkaya now. There are some castle hangover from term of Byzantine Empire, Rome Era and Selçuklu Era in villages of Akşar, Eskişar and Kale and also in Çataloluk.

The villages of Büyükgüzel and Küçükgüzel which are ancient localization areas are the important centres in Roman Era. That registered from. The marble head of lion which was found in Küçükgüzel is exhibited at Museum of Sivas. Also there are some objects from the same area which are protected in The Garden of Administration Hall.

Akşar (Akşar-Abat), town of Suşehri, was an important centre in Middle Age. Also Suşehri and around of it was depended to Akşar and so we understand that Plain of Suşehri is called ‘Plain of Akşar’ in historical sources.

Culture 
One of the most important facts affecting the cultural structure is its geographical position. Because of being on the border of Anatolia and Black Sea, it shows both species of folk and plant properties.

References

Populated places in Sivas Province
Districts of Sivas Province